Nechtan, Nectan or Neithon may refer to:

Kings
 Nechtan Morbet, king of the Picts
 Nechtan nepos Uerb, king of the Picts
 Nechtan mac Der-Ilei (died 732), king of the Picts
 Neithon of Alt Clut, King of Strathclyde

Other people
 Nechtan of Aberdeen, bishop of Aberdeen
 Saint Nectan of Hartland, associated with Devon and Cornwall
 Saint Nectan, nephew and disciple of Saint Patrick

Mythology
 Nechtan Scéne, character in the Irish Ulster Cycle
 Nechtan (mythology), an Irish god
 Nechtan mac Collbran, Irish-mythological character in the Voyage of Bran